The Minister for Social Security (Swedish: Socialförsäkringsminister) is a cabinet minister within the Swedish Government. The cabinet minister is appointed by the Prime Minister of Sweden.

List of Ministers for Social Security 

|}

Government ministers of Sweden
Swedish Ministers for Health
Swedish Ministers for Social Affairs